Events from the year 2002 in Macau, China.

Incumbents
 Chief Executive - Edmund Ho
 President of the Legislative Assembly - Susana Chou

Events

April
 21 April - 2002 Hong Kong–Macau Interport.

October
 28 October - The launch of Lotus TV Macau.

References

 
Years of the 21st century in Macau
Macau
Macau
2000s in Macau